Lonsana Doumbouya (born 26 September 1990) is a Guinean professional footballer who plays for Thai League 1 club Buriram United.

Club career
Doumbouya played in his native France early in his career. He played for Belgian club Cercle Brugge during the 2015–16 season.

On 25 August 2016, Doumbouya signed for Scottish Premiership club Inverness Caledonian Thistle, on a two-year deal.

However on 31 January 2017 he was released from his contract with Inverness which allowed him to sign for Austrian Bundesliga side St. Polten.

On 30 July 2021, Doumbouya joined Chinese Super League club Shanghai Shenhua. By the time of the transfer, he was the top goalscorer in the 2021 China League One with 10 goals. On 29 April 2022, Doumbouya left Shanghai Shenhua.

International career
Doumouya was born in France to parents of Guinean descent. He debuted for the Guinea national football team in a 2–1 2018 World Cup qualification loss to the DR Congo on 13 November 2016.

Career statistics
.

References

External links
Doumbouya, Lonsana at National-football-teams.com

1990 births
Living people
Citizens of Guinea through descent
Guinean footballers
Guinea international footballers
French footballers
French sportspeople of Guinean descent
French expatriate footballers
Expatriate footballers in Belgium
Expatriate footballers in Scotland
Inverness Caledonian Thistle F.C. players
Scottish Professional Football League players
CO Saint-Dizier players
En Avant Guingamp players
Genêts Anglet players
A.F.C. Tubize players
Cercle Brugge K.S.V. players
SKN St. Pölten players
Expatriate footballers in Austria
R.C.S. Verviétois players
Expatriate footballers in Thailand
Lonsana Doumbouya
Lonsana Doumbouya
Lonsana Doumbouya
Lonsana Doumbouya
Meizhou Hakka F.C. players
China League One players
Shanghai Shenhua F.C. players
Chinese Super League players
Expatriate footballers in China
Association football forwards
Black French sportspeople